Bronxville Union Free School District is a public school district serving the Village of Bronxville, Westchester County, New York. In 2023, 1603 students were enrolled in the district elementary, middle and high school which are all housed within the same large building. In 2012 Bronxville High School was ranked the second best "open enrollment" high school in the US. In 2000 Bronxville High School was ranked the 5th best high school in the country by Newsweek magazine. The high school is also in the top 100 high schools in the country according to US News and is the highest ranked "open enrollment" high school in New York State.

History
David Quattrone became the superintendent in 2005; he resigned in 2016. The district in 2016 had about 1,700 students, and in 2017 it had about 1,670 students. Roy Montesano, previously of the Hastings-on-Hudson school district, became the superintendent in 2017, and was replaced by Dr. Rachel Kelly after Montesano's retirement in January 2023. In the early 2000s, there was substantial construction and renovation which, at one point, generated some letters of protest from students.

The community of Bronxville

Bronxville is a mile-square suburb north of New York City in Westchester County, New York. It was named after Swedish immigrant Jonas Bronck. The latitude is 40.938N; longitude is -73.832W. It is in the Eastern Standard time zone. Estimated population (2003) was 6,515 according to census data. The median household income is over $200,000. It is located on the Bronx River. The town used to be called "Underhill's Crossing". It was developed by William Van Duzer Lawrence after 1889 who purchased farmland and zoned it with large lots for single-family houses but also apartment buildings and numerous rental townhouse complexes. Lawrence founded Sarah Lawrence College in 1928 in memory of his wife. The town attracted many artists and became known as an "artist's colony". The public library financed a major expansion in 2001 when it sold a painting for $4.1 million.  The school is centrally located in the town across from the Dutch Reformed Church of Bronxville, diagonally opposite the town hall, and across from the Bronxville public library; it is one block away from the shopping area of the town.

School structure

The elementary school, middle school, and high school are located in one large building near the downtown.The campus, located on Pondfield Road, is located in a low point in the town; during particularly heavy rains in the past, the school has experienced flooding. There was a period when the school was closed for several weeks as a result of flooding. As a result, boilers and heating equipment have been moved to higher levels, and basement areas have been remodeled with moisture resistant substances in case the building is flooded again.

Staff

In 2023, the superintendent of schools is Dr. Rachel Kelly, and the assistant superintendent is Dr. Mary Koetke. The high school principal is Ann Meyer, the assistant principal is Marcellus Lessane, who is also the middle school assistant principal. The middle school principal is Joe Mercora. The principal of the elementary school is Rakiya Adams; the assistant principal is Anthony Vaglica. As of 2023, there are 1,603 students at Bronxville. A limited number of out-of-district students can enroll in Bronxville High School at a yearly tuition determined by New York State and enacted by the Board of Education.

Foundation

The school has a foundation, created in 1991, which solicits donations from community members, alumni, corporations and others to raise monies for special programs to provide new equipment, programs, curriculum innovations, teacher training and tools. Since 1991, and as of 2023, the foundation has made grants totaling $12 million of support; 2021-2022 donations were at least $483,000, according to information from the foundation.

Rankings and reputation

The high school consistently ranks in the top 50 best high schools in the country by Newsweek and in the top 100 by US News. In 2000 Bronxville High School was ranked the 5th best high school in the country by Newsweek. Newsweek magazine rated the district 40th in the nation in a 2012 ranking and 42nd in a 2013 ranking. In 2012 Bronxville High School was ranked 2nd among "open enrollment" high schools in the country.  In 2015 the district was ranked 29th in the country by Newsweek magazine. In 2012, average SAT scores were 1898. The high school offers advanced placement courses, among them Calculus (AB and BC), English Literature, English Language and Composition, Environmental Science, Biology, Statistics and Computer Science (offered on alternating years), Chemistry, World History, U.S. History, Economics (Micro and Macro), Art History, Studio Art, French, Spanish, and Latin.  In 2000, every one of the high school's 79 graduates went on to higher education. In 1991, Bronxville high school was one of two schools singled out by President George H. W. Bush as a "school of excellence." In 2014, Bronxville Elementary School was named a Reward School for "high performance" by the New York State Department of Education. The district offers musical instruction. In 2010 the average SAT score was 1950, the highest in Westchester County.

In 2016 Colleen Wilson of The Journal News wrote that "The district, in which 99 percent of its high school seniors graduated in 2015, has students who consistently test above the state average."

Arts programs
Bronxville School District has a strong music program.  In 3rd grade, students study the recorder, then in 4th grade, each student chooses a musical instrument to study.  In middle school, students may choose band, chorus or orchestra.  Music instruction is given three times per six-day cycle and grades are given.  The Middle and High School Bands and Orchestras compete yearly in the NYSSMA competition.  In 2014, 2016, and 2017, the High School Orchestra won Gold with Distinction for level VI at NYSSMA Majors. In 2014 the Middle School Orchestra won Silver.

Bronxville School District also has a performing arts program, which under the direction of Peter Royal, presents two high school plays per year; a dramatical in the fall and a musical in the spring.  Past performances include Urinetown, The Sound of Music, The Diary of Anne Frank and the Heidi Chronicles.  Every other year, the High School Drama Department takes performers to the Edinburgh Fringe Festival to perform.

Athletic programs

There are athletic programs for football, basketball, baseball, field hockey, track, cross country, lacrosse, mountain biking, and other sports. In 2010, Bronxville won three varsity state titles: Women's Track, Football, and Women's Soccer. The men's varsity basketball team plays Pawling High School, Tappan Zee High School, Sacred Heart - Yonkers High School, Haldane Central High School, Clark Academy, Valhalla High School, Rye Neck High School, Tuckahoe High School, Blind Brook High School, Keio Academy of New York, High School, Harrison High School, and Martin Luther King High School (Hastings on Hudson). In 2008 the girl's varsity field hockey team went to the final four competition for state champions. Also in 2008, the Boy's varsity soccer team won states. The boy's varsity football team won states 2010 (runner up to Jamestown Southwestern in 2009). Bronxville High School's football team plays other high schools including Valhalla High School, Dobbs Ferry High School, Albertus Magnus High School, Croton-Harmon High School, Rye Neck High School. Bronxville also has a reputation for its lacrosse program, with the varsity girls team making it to the championship every year in the past few years. Additionally, the boys varsity team won the 2014 state championship, the first in Bronxville history. Many of the lacrosse players at Bronxville continue their lacrosse careers in D1, D2, or D3 college lacrosse programs, including Yale, Syracuse, Notre Dame, Georgetown, Duke, Johns Hopkins, Maryland, etc. It has several athletic fields including a football/soccer field with bleachers. There are four indoor gymnasiums, a library on the second floor, an auditorium, a drama lab area, and a cafeteria.

Notable alumni

 Chris Baio, bassist in American indie-rock band Vampire Weekend.
 Adam Bertocci, writer and filmmaker, graduated 2001.
Mary Cain, runner
Roger Goodell, NFL Commissioner
Karyn Marshall, world champion women's weight lifter in 1987, graduated 1974.
 Gary Robinson, software engineer developed anti-spam mathematical algorithms.
Lis Smith, American campaign manager

References

External links

Bronxville, New York
School districts in Westchester County, New York
Public high schools in Westchester County, New York
Public middle schools in Westchester County, New York
K-12 schools in Westchester County, New York
Public elementary schools in New York (state)
Public schools in Westchester County, New York
School districts established in 1922
1922 establishments in New York (state)